Very Nice, Very Nice is a Canadian avant-garde collage film made by Arthur Lipsett in 1961, and produced by the National Film Board of Canada.

Plot
Thoughts about day-to-day life interpreted through snapshots and sound collages pondering if life is better than it was thirty years ago.

Production
While working at the National Film Board, Lipsett collected pieces of audio from the waste bins and pieced them together as a hobby.  When his friends heard the product of this they suggested that he add images to it. The result was this film.

Reception
Very Nice, Very Nice was nominated for the Academy Award for Best Live Action Short Film at the 34th Academy Awards.

Legacy
Stanley Kubrick wrote to Lipsett to praise Very Nice, Very Nice, stating that it was "the most imaginative and brilliant uses of the movie screen and soundtrack that I have ever seen." Kubrick asked him to create a trailer for his upcoming Dr. Strangelove. Lipsett declined Kubrick's offer. Pablo Ferro eventually went on to direct the trailer himself; however, Lipsett's influence on Kubrick is clearly visible in the released trailer.

By 1970, the film had 200 prints in circulation.  It is often shown at film festivals and in film schools. American experimental filmmaker Stan Brakhage was given a copy of the film at one point.

See also
Modernist film
Conformity
United States in the 1950s

References

External links
 Watch Very Nice, Very Nice at NFB.ca
 
 Analysis of Very Nice, Very Nice by Michael Baker

1961 films
Collage film
1960s English-language films
National Film Board of Canada short films
Canadian black-and-white films
Films directed by Arthur Lipsett
Films produced by Colin Low (filmmaker)
Films produced by Tom Daly
1960s avant-garde and experimental films
English-language Canadian films
Canadian avant-garde and experimental short films
1960s Canadian films